In poetry, a tetrameter is a line of four metrical feet. The particular foot can vary, as follows:
 Anapestic tetrameter:
 "And the sheen of their spears was like stars on the sea" (Lord Byron, "The Destruction of Sennacherib")
 "Twas the night before Christmas when all through the house"  ("A Visit from St. Nicholas")
 Iambic tetrameter:
 "Because I could not stop for Death" (Emily Dickinson, eponymous lyric)
 Trochaic tetrameter:
 "Peter, Peter, pumpkin-eater" (English nursery rhyme)
 Dactylic tetrameter:
 Picture your self in a boat on a river with [...] (The Beatles, "Lucy in the Sky with Diamonds")
 Spondaic tetrameter:
 Long sounds move slow
 Pyrrhic tetrameter (with spondees ["white breast" and "dim sea"]):
 And the white breast of the dim sea
 Amphibracic tetrameter:
 And, speaking of birds, there's the Russian Palooski,  / Whose headski is redski and belly is blueski. (Dr. Seuss)

See also
Iambic pentameter
Anapestic tetrameter

External links
Tetrameter.com A website devoted to verse in tetrameter

Types of verses